Shahrak-e Emam Khomeyni or Shahrak Emam Khomeyni may refer to:
 Shahrak-e Emam Khomeyni, Chaharmahal and Bakhtiari
 Shahrak-e Emam Khomeyni, Eqlid, Fars Province
 Shahrak-e Emam Khomeyni, Mohr, Fars Province
 Shahrak-e Emam Khomeyni, Qir and Karzin, Fars Province
 Shahrak-e Emam Khomeyni, Hormozgan
 Shahrak Emam Khomeyni, Kerman
 Shahrak-e Emam Khomeyni, Khuzestan
 Shahrak-e Emam Khomeyni, Delfan, Lorestan Province
 Shahrak Emam Khomeyni, Kuhdasht, Lorestan Province
 Shahrak-e Emam Khomeyni, Mazandaran
 Shahrak-e Emam Khomeyni, Razavi Khorasan
 Shahrak-e Emam Khomeyni, South Khorasan